Bellevue Manufacturing Company is a historic textile mill complex located at Hillsborough, Orange County, North Carolina.  The main mill was built about 1909, and is a two-story, side-gabled brick building, with a one-story boiler room and engine room wing. It is representative of slow-burn heavy timber construction. A one-story brick weaving room with monitor roof was built parallel to the main mill in 1920.  In 1923, the wing was raised to two stories and an addition built to connect to the weaving room forming a "U"-shaped complex. The center of the "U" was filled in during the 1960s.  Also in 1923, a separate two-story cloth building was constructed.

It was listed on the National Register of Historic Places in 2003.

On May 20, 2016, the  weaving room was completely destroyed by a multi-alarm fire, which required mutual aid from seven local fire departments to extinguish.

References

Textile mills in North Carolina
Industrial buildings and structures on the National Register of Historic Places in North Carolina
Industrial buildings completed in 1909
Companies based in Hillsborough, North Carolina
Buildings and structures in Orange County, North Carolina
National Register of Historic Places in Orange County, North Carolina